Advocate Good Samaritan Hospital is a 333-bed community hospital located in Downers Grove, in the US state Illinois.  The hospital opened in 1976, and operates the only Level I trauma center in the county of DuPage.  Advocate Good Samaritan Hospital is a part of Advocate Aurora Health.

Advocate Good Samaritan Hospital has earned a spot on the 100 Top Hospitals list five times.

Services
Advocate Good Samaritan Hospital has 333 beds, and more than 1,000 physicians representing 63 specialties.  There are 2,600 employees at the hospital, and services include: cardiology, orthopedic surgery, general surgery, gastroenterology, stroke care, obstetrics and gynecology, low dose diagnostic imaging, and a comprehensive breast center.  The emergency department is the only Level I trauma center in DuPage County.

The hospital has level III designation for obstetric, perinatal and neonatal services, which is the highest designation in the state.

Awards and recognition
Advocate Good Samaritan Hospital is the only health care provider in Illinois to have earned the Malcolm Baldrige National Quality Award—the highest presidential honor for performance excellence.

 100 Top Hospitals National Benchmarks Study, 2009, 2011, 2012, 2013, 2014
 Magnet Recognition for Excellence in Nursing Services, 2009–14
 50 Top Cardiovascular Hospitals, 2011
 Blue Distinction Center for Knee and Hip Replacement by Blue Cross Blue Shield of Illinois
 Bariatric Surgery Center of Excellence
 Lincoln Gold Award for Achievement of Excellence, 2010
 Practice Greenhealth Environmental Leadership Circle Award, 2012, 2013

See also
 Advocate Lutheran General Hospital
 Advocate Sherman Hospital

References

External links
 

Hospital buildings completed in 1976
Downers Grove, Illinois
Buildings and structures in DuPage County, Illinois
Hospitals in Illinois
Hospitals established in 1976
1976 establishments in Illinois
Trauma centers